Wolfgang Mayrhofer (born May 24, 1958) is an Austrian competitive sailor and Olympic silver medalist as well as professor of management at WU (Vienna University of Business and Economics) in Vienna., Austria.

He won a silver medal in the Finn class at the 1980 Summer Olympics in Moscow. Mayrhofer is sailing since the age of 5. From 1963-1973 he sailed Optimist, the most popular single-handed boat for children below the age of 15; 1969 top-sailor worldwide in the Optimist below the age of 12. Sailing OK-Dinghy from 1974-1976 and Finn-Dinghy (Olympic class since 1952) from 1976-1983. In OK and Finn several times national champion; participating in numerous European and World championships at the junior and senior level. In the Finn-class European vice-champion (junior) in Finn in 1979; silver medallist in the Olympic Games in 1980 (Moscow/Tallinn). Since 1983 hobby sailing with occasional dinghy and big-boat racing.

He is co-founder of Championships (see http://www.championSHIPs.at) that uses sail boats as a unique field of experience and regularly offers trainings for middle and top managers, focusing on team building, team development, leadership and communication.

Professional life
At the professional level, Wolfgang Mayrhofer is Professor of Management and Organisational Behaviour at the Institute of Organisation Studies and Organisational Behaviour, Department of Management, WU (Vienna University of Economics and Business), Austria. He previously has held research and teaching positions at the University of Paderborn, Germany, and at Dresden University of Technology, Germany, after receiving his diploma and doctoral degrees in Business Administration from WU.
 
He conducts research in the area of comparative international human resource management and leadership, work careers, and systems theory and management and has received several national and international rewards for outstanding research and service to the academic community. He has had many international teaching assignments, among others at Copenhagen Business School (Denmark), the United Nations (Geneva), ESADE (Barcelona, Spain), Estonian Business School (Tallinn, Estonia), Hertie School of Governance (Berlin, Germany), INCAE (Costa Rica), Rotterdam School of Management (The Netherlands), Universidad Carlos III (Madrid, Spain) and University of Istanbul (Turkey) and regularly consults to both private and public sector organisations, with an emphasis on leadership, team and self-development by outdoor training/sailing (see www.championSHIPs.at).

Wolfgang Mayrhofer is a member of the editorial/advisory editorial board of the Journal for Managerial Psychology, the Journal for Cross-Cultural Competence and Management, the Journal of the International Society for Research in Healthcare Financial Management, the Journal of Management Spirituality and Religion, Management Revue, Zeitschrift für Personalforschung, The Jordanian Journal of Administrative Sciences, the ESADE-DEUSTO Series ‘Managing people in 21st century organisations’ and a corresponding member of Journal for East European Management Studies. He also is an associate at the Centre for Research into the Management of Expatriation, Cranfield, UK, a research fellow at the Centre for Global Workforce Strategy, Simon Fraser University, Canada, member of the academic advisory board of AHRMIO, the Association of Human Resource Management in International Organisations and an appointed visiting professor at Henley Management College, UK.

He is married and has four children, three daughters and one son.

Writing
He has authored and co-authored more than 150 book chapters and about 90 peer reviewed articles which have been published, among others, in Career Development International, Employee Relations, Human Relations, Human Resource Management Journal, Human Resource Management Review, International Journal for Human Resource Management, International Studies of Management & Organization, International Executive, Journal of Managerial Psychology, Journal of Occupational and Organisational Psychology, Journal of Vocational Behavior, Management Revue, Organisation Studies, Organizational Dynamics, Die Betriebswirtschaft, Zeitschrift für Personalforschung and Personal.

Wolfgang Mayrhofer has authored, co-authored and co-edited 33 books, among them most recently: Altman, Yochanan, Judi Neal, and Wolfgang Mayrhofer (Eds.). 2022. Workplace Spirituality. Making a Difference. Berlin, Boston: de Gruyter; Gunz, H. P., Lazarova, M. B., & Mayrhofer, W. (Eds.). 2020. The Routledge Companion to Career Studies. Milton Park: Routledge; Brewster, C., Mayrhofer, W., & Farndale, E. (Eds.). 2018. Handbook Of Research On Comparative Human Resource Management. (2 ed.). Cheltenham: Edward Elgar; Gunz, H. & Mayrhofer, W. 2018. Rethinking Career Studies. Facilitating Conversation Across Boundaries with the Social Chronology Framework. Cambridge: Cambridge University Press; Mabey, C. & Mayrhofer, W. (Eds.). 2015. Developing Leadership. Questions Business Schools Don't Ask. Los Angeles et al.: Sage; Mayrhofer, W., Furtmüller, G., & Kasper, H. (Eds.). 2015. Personalmanagement - Führung - Organisation (5 ed.). Wien: Linde; Brewster, C., & Mayrhofer, W. (Eds.). 2012. Handbook Of Research On Comparative Human Resource Management. Cheltenham: Edward Elgar; Briscoe, J. P., Hall, D. T., & Mayrhofer, W. (Eds.). 2012. Careers Around the World. Individual and Contextual Perspectives. New York, Oxon: Routledge Mayrhofer, W., Meyer, M., & Titscher, S. (Eds.). 2010. Praxis der Organisationsanalyse. Anwendungsfelder und Methoden (Practice of organizational analysis. Areas of application and methods). Wien: Facultas wuv.

References

External links
 homepage: https://www.wu.ac.at/ivm/team/wolfgang-mayrhofer

1958 births
Living people
Austrian male sailors (sport)
Sailors at the 1980 Summer Olympics – Finn
Olympic sailors of Austria
Olympic silver medalists for Austria
Olympic medalists in sailing
Medalists at the 1980 Summer Olympics
Hertie School people